Kuchiamora Union is a union parishad situated at Magura Sadar Upazila,  in Magura District, Khulna Division of Bangladesh. There are 17 villages and 16 mouzas in the union.

References

External links
 

Unions of Khulna Division
Unions of Magura Sadar Upazila
Unions of Magura District